União Desportiva Aeroporto, Picão e Belo Monte (Portuguese meaning the Picão e Belo Monte Airport Sporting Union, abbreviation and common form: UDAPB) is a football club that plays in Santo António in the island of Principe in São Tomé and Príncipe.  The team plays in the Principe Island League in its local division and plays at Estádio 13 de Julho in the island capital as every club on the island does.  It is located next to the island's only airport and is based in the village of Picão and the club area includes the Santo António subdivision of Aeroporto and Belo Monte, São Tomé and Príncipe in the northeast whose the club areas included, other areas includes the whole northeast of the island and Santa Rita.

History
The club was founded with the merger of then unregistered clubs of Picão, Aeroporto de Príncipe and Belo Monte and not longer after became registered. The team won their only island title in 2007.  Its titles totals were third and were shared with 1º de Maio until 2012 when Sporting shared it, along with 1º de Maio, its title total became fifth which is since 2013.

In the nationals on May 12, 2007, UDAPB competed against Sporting Clube Praia Cruz at Estádio Nacional 12 de Julho and lost 2–4.

Between late 2012 and late 2015, UDAPB and FC Porto Real were the two remaining cubs without a regional cup title, since late-2015, UDAPB is the only club on the island without a cup title and the only who never appeared at a national cup competition.

On September 30 at the island's stadium, UDAPB got their chance to win their only cup title and attempt to have not a single team without a cup title, this failed as they lost to FC Porto Real 3–2 in a cup final.

Honours
 Principe League Island Championship: 1
2007

Statistics
Best position: Finalist (national)
Best position at cup competitions: Finalist (regional)
Appearances:
National Championships: 1
Total goals scored at the national championships: 2

References

External links
Club profile at the Final Ball

Football clubs in São Tomé and Príncipe
Príncipe Island League